Pięciu ("Five") is a 1964 Polish drama film directed by Paweł Komorowski.

Cast
 Marian Kociniak as Kazio
 Andrzej Zaorski as Staszek
 Bogusław Sochnacki as Rysiek
 Ryszard Pietruski as Bernard Kalus
 Tadeusz Kalinowski as Wala
 Anna Ciepielewska as Wala's Wife Maryjka
 Magda Celówna as Rysiek's Sister Alka
 Helena Dąbrowska as Rysiek's Mother Helga
 Maria Kaniewska as Gerda Buchtowa
 Genowefa Korska
 Jolanta Umecka as Edyta Buchta
 Jerzy Nowak as Alfred Buchta
 Witold Pyrkosz as Alojz

References

External links
 

1964 films
1964 drama films
Polish drama films
Polish black-and-white films
1960s Polish-language films
Films scored by Wojciech Kilar